Alida   is a village in the Canadian province of Saskatchewan within the Rural Municipality of Reciprocity No. 32 and Census Division No. 1. Farming and oil are the major local industries. Several ghost towns are in the vicinity, including Nottingham to the east, Auburnton, to the west, and Cantal to the north-west. With the investment of oil and other industries, the area continues to grow.

History
Alida was founded as a Canadian Pacific Railway station in the late 19th century, and it was named for Dame Alida Brittain. The local area was settled by immigrants from Europe, and other parts of North America. Alida incorporated as a village on February 19, 1926.

The rail line was closed in 1976 when a spring storm washed out the rail bridge near Lauder, Manitoba, at the beginning of the line. The economic viability of the line had been in question for some time, so the bridge was never repaired. Track was removed beginning in 1978.

Transportation
Alida is at the cross-roads of three highways, Highway 361, Highway 318, and Highway 601.

Demographics

Sports and recreation
Alida has a skating/curling rink. In 2014, the original ice rink flooded and was deemed too expensive to repair. It was torn down in 2015 and funds were raised for a new one. It was completed by 2017. The Alida Wrecks hockey team play there. The Alida Memorial Hall hosts weekly bingos and an annual dinner theatre. There is also a pool that opens during the summer.

Education
The local school closed down in 2005, and students are bused to schools in Carnduff, Oxbow, or Redvers.

Notable people
Dan D'Autremont - Saskatchewan Party member of the Legislative Assembly of Saskatchewan for the constituency of Cannington

See also
 List of communities in Saskatchewan
 Block settlement
 List of villages in Saskatchewan

References

External links

Villages in Saskatchewan
Reciprocity No. 32, Saskatchewan
Division No. 1, Saskatchewan